A play bus (or playbus or learning bus) is a bus used for providing a mobile facility for a variety of activities surrounding entertainment and education, usually for children of pre-school or school age.

Play buses are usually specially converted for their purpose, usually from second hand vehicles, although occasionally are purpose built by a bus manufacturer. Play buses can be any size, from minibuses to double-deckers and may be operated by charities, education authorities or as private businesses. The latter particularly market their services as a mobile party venue for children's birthday celebrations and the like.

Depending on usage and fittings, play buses may provide mobile playgrounds, gymnasiums, library services, or education centres as a mobile classroom.

In the United Kingdom, the National Playbus Association is a charity that provides support and advice to organisations wishing to operate play buses. Formed in 1969, it is now supported by various government departments.

See also 

 Bookmobile
 Biobus

References

External links 

 Working on Wheels (the working title of National Playbus in the UK)  

Learning
Play (activity)
Buses by type